Justus Hübsch von Grossthal was an Imperial Russian noble and military person of Danish-German descent. He served as governor of Baku Governorate between 1882 and 1888.

Life 
He was born on 28 August 1822 to Casimir-Alphonse Hübsch von Grossthal, Danish chargé d’affaires to Constantinople and Catherina Navoni (1782-1869) in Ottoman Empire. Hübsch family hailed from Denmark, starting as merchants in Pera neighborhood of Constantinople, then gradually involving in diplomacy. They gained "Grossthal" (from  - Great Valley) thanks to their villa in Büyükdere (literally "Great Valley" in Turkish) quarter of Constantinople.

He started as officer of the Imperial Russian army on 10 August 1844. He reached the rank of colonel in 1848 and participated in the Hungarian campaign later in 1849. Having participated in the Caucasian War in 1860 with success, he transferred to Odessa Military District in 1865. He was promoted to major-general in 1877 and was transferred to Baku in 1879. 

He was appointed as governor of Baku Governorate on 24 March 1882 and served there until 8 January 1888. During his governorate he tried to subdue robber bands in Quba uyezd with limited success. He died on 3 February 1898, in Odessa.

Family 
He was married to Ecaterina Barbu from Știrbei family on 1 August 1851 in Bucharest. However their children died young and Ecaterina died in 1854. Justus later married to a Frenchwoman Adèle Fonton on 17 February 1857. She died on 24 December 1881.

References 

Imperial Russian Army generals
1822 births
1898 deaths
People from Baku Governorate